Richard Bourne (14 June 1878–1957) was an English footballer who played in the Football League for Barnsley, Clapton Orient, Preston North End, Sheffield United and West Bromwich Albion.

References

1879 births
1954 deaths
English footballers
Association football forwards
English Football League players
Roundel F.C. players
Sheffield United F.C. players
Barnsley F.C. players
Preston North End F.C. players
Leyton Orient F.C. players
West Bromwich Albion F.C. players
Walsall F.C. players